Let's Dance was an early Australian television series. The 15-minute series ran weekly from 25 March to 23 September 1957, and aired on Melbourne station HSV-7.

The series featured Sue and Colin Campbell, who demonstrated dancing for the viewers. Sue Campbell would put decorations on her shoes to attract viewers attention to her feet.

It is not known if any of the episodes exist as kinescope recordings.

References

External links

Seven Network original programming
1957 Australian television series debuts
1957 Australian television series endings
English-language television shows
Black-and-white Australian television shows
Dance television shows